The 11th (Northern) Division, was an infantry division of the British Army during the First World War, raised from men who had volunteered for Lord Kitchener's New Armies. The division fought in the Gallipoli Campaign and on the Western Front. The division's insignia was an ankh or ankhus.

History
The division came into existence on 21 August 1914 under Army Order No. 324, which authorised the formation of the first six new divisions of Kitchener's Army. The division was composed of early wartime volunteers and assembled at Belton Park near Grantham. 

By mid-1915, the recruits were judged to be ready for active service, and the division sailed for the Mediterranean in June-July 1915. As part of the Suvla Bay landing force, it reinforced the British expeditionary force at Gallipoli, on 7 August. The 6th (Service) Battalion, Alexandra, Princess of Wales Own (Yorkshire Regiment) (32nd Brigade) was the first "Kitchener unit" to be involved in a major offensive operation of the war. Its action at Lala Baba Hill, on 7 August, was costly: all but three of its officers were killed, including the CO, Colonel E. H. Chapman, were killed. Afterwards the hill was known to the Allies as York Hill. The division continued to serve at Gallipoli, suffering high casualties, until the evacuation of Suvla in December 1915. It then spent a period of time in Egypt, guarding the Suez Canal.

The division was transferred to France in mid-1916 and saw action in the Battle of the Somme. It remained on the Western Front until the armistice of 11 November 1918. 

On 28 June 1919, exactly five years since the assassination of Archduke Franz Ferdinand of Austria, the 11th (Northern) Division was officially disbanded, having sustained more than 32,100 casualties during the war.

Order of battle
The division comprised the following units and formations:

 32nd Brigade 

 9th Battalion, Prince of Wales's Own (West Yorkshire Regiment)  – absorbed 1/1st Yorkshire Hussars October 1917 and became 9th (Yorkshire Hussars) Battalion, West Yorkshire Regiment
 6th Battalion, East Yorkshire Regiment – became divisional pioneers 18 January 1915
 6th Battalion, Alexandra, Princess of Wales Own (Yorkshire Regiment) (Green Howards) – absorbed into 2nd Battalion 16 May 1918
 8th Battalion, Duke of Wellington's (West Riding Regiment) – from 34 Bde 18 January 1915; disbanded and drafted February 1918
 6th Battalion, York and Lancaster Regiment
 2nd Battalion, Green Howards – joined from 30th Division 14 May 1918
 32nd Brigade Machine Gun Company – formed March 1916; joined 11th Battalion, Machine Gun Corps (MGC), 28 February 1918
 32nd Brigade Trench Mortar Battery – joined July 1917

 33rd Brigade 
 6th Battalion, Lincolnshire Regiment
 6th Battalion, Border Regiment – disbanded and drafted February 1918
 7th Battalion, South Staffordshire Regiment
 9th Battalion, Sherwood Foresters (Nottingham and Derbyshire Regiment)
 5th Battalion, Dorsetshire Regiment– from Army Troops; to 34 Bde 18 January 1915
 33rd Brigade Machine Gun Company – formed March 1916; joined 11th Battalion MGC 28 February 1918 
 33rd Brigade Trench Mortar Battery – joined July 1917

 34th Brigade 
 8th Battalion, Northumberland Fusiliers
 9th Battalion, Lancashire Fusiliers – disbanded and drafted February 1918
 8th Battalion, Duke of Wellington's Regiment  – to 32 Bde 18 January 1915
 11th Battalion, Manchester Regiment
 5th Battalion, Dorsetshire Regiment – from 33 Bde 18 January 1915
 34th Brigade Machine Gun Company – formed March 1916; joined 11th Battalion MGC 28 February 1918 
 34th Brigade Trench Mortar Battery – joined July 1917

 1/2nd South-Western Mounted Brigade 
(Serving dismounted) – attached at Suvla 9 October to 15 November 1915
 1/1st Royal 1st Devon Yeomanry
 1/1st Royal North Devon Yeomanry
 1/1st West Somerset Yeomanry
 1/2nd South-Western Signal Troop, Royal Engineers (RE)
 1/2nd South-Western Field Ambulance, Royal Army Medical Corps (RAMC)

 Divisional Mounted Troops
 11th Divisional Cyclist Company, Army Cyclist Corps – formed January–March 1915; to VI Corps Cyclist Battalion 12 July 1916
 B Squadron, 1/1st Hertfordshire Yeomanry – joined 4 April 1916 in Egypt; to VI Corps in France 12 July 1916

 Divisional Royal Artillery
 LVIII Brigade, Royal Field Artillery (RFA)
 184, 185, 186 Batteries – 6-gun batteries reorganised by February 1915 as 4-gun batteries designated A, B, C and D
 LVIII Brigade Ammunition Column (BAC)
 LIX Brigade, RFA
 187, 188, 189 Batteries – A, B, C, D by February 1915
 LIX BAC
 LX Brigade, RFA
 190, 191, 192 Batteries – A, B, C, D by February 1915
 LX BAC
 LXI (Howitzer) Brigade, RFA – remained in England when division went to Gallipoli; later joined Guards Division
 193 (H), 194 (H), 195 (H) Batteries – A, B, C, D by February 1915
 LIX (H) BAC
 11th Divisional Ammunition Column – remained in England when division went to Gallipoli
 1st Hull Heavy Battery, Royal Garrison Artillery (RGA) and Ammunition Column – redesignated 11th (Hull) Heavy Battery May 1915; remained in England when division went to Gallipoli; later went to East Africa

Also attached:
 LV Brigade, RFA – attached from 10th (Irish) Division at Suvla until the evacuation
 LVII (H) Brigade, RFA – attached from 10th (Irish) Division at Suvla until the evacuation
 IV Lowland (H) Brigade, RFA (TF) – attached from 52nd (Lowland) Division at Suvla until the evacuation
 IV Highland (Mountain) Brigade, RGA (TF) – attached from 29th Division at Suvla until the evacuation
 10th Heavy Battery, RGA – attached from 10th (Irish) Division at Suvla until the evacuation
 91st Heavy Battery, RGA – attached in England; detached at Gallipoli and landed at Cape Helles

After 1916 reorganisations
 LVIII Brigade, RFA
 A, B, C Batteries
 D Battery – became A (H) Battery, CXXXIII (H) Brigade 26 April 1916
 LIX Brigade, RFA
 A, B, C Batteries
 D Battery – became B (H) Battery, CXXXIII (H) Brigade 26 April 1916
 LX Brigade, RFA – broken up 25 January 1917
 A, B, C Batteries
 D Battery – became CXXXIII BAC 26 April 1916
 CXXXIII (Howitzer) Brigade, RFA – formed in 26 April 1916 as 'The Howitzer Brigade, RFA', renamed 31 May 1916; broken up between LVIII and LIX Brigades November–December 1916
 A (H) Battery – from LVIII Brigade 26 April 1916
 B (H) Battery – from LIX Brigade 26 April 1916
 CXXXIII BAC – from LX Brigade 26 April; became C (H) Battery 22 June; broken up between A (H) and B (H) Batteries 29 August 1916
 501 (H) Battery – joined 15, left 27 November 1916
 CXVIII (H) Brigade, RFA – joined from 1st Canadian Division 15 July 1916 and broken up
 458 (H) Battery – became D (H) Battery, LVIII Brigade
 459 (H) Battery – became D (H) Battery, LIX Brigade
 461 (H) Battery – became D (H) Battery, LX Brigade
 X/11, Y/11, Z/11 Medium Trench Mortar Batteries – joined 9 August 1916
 11th Divisional Ammunition Column – rejoined in France 7 July 1916 and absorbed BACs

After Winter 1916–17 reorganisation
 LVIII Brigade, RFA
 A, B, C, D (H) Batteries
 LIX Brigade, RFA
 A, B, C, D (H) Batteries
 X/11 Medium Trench Mortar Battery
 Y/11 Medium Trench Mortar Battery
 Z/11 Medium Trench Mortar Battery – absorbed by X/11 and Y/11 on 3 February 1918
 V/11 Heavy Trench Mortar Battery – left February 1918

Divisional Royal Engineers
 67th Field Company, RE
 68th Field Company, RE
 68th Field Company, RE – joined from 21st Division 7 February 1915
 11th Divisional Signal Company, RE

Divisional Pioneers 
 6th Battalion, East Yorkshire Regiment

Divisional Machine Gun Troops
 11 Divisional Motor Machine Gun Company – joined 9 June 1915; remained in England when division went to Gallipoli
 250th Machine Gun Company, MGC - joined 16 November 1917
 11th Battalion, MGC – formed 28 February 1918
 32nd, 33rd, 34th, 250th MG Companies

Divisional Medical Services
 33rd Field Ambulance, Royal Army Medical Corps (RAMC)
 34th Field Ambulance, RAMC
 35th Field Ambulance, RAMC
 22nd Mobile Veterinary Section, Army Veterinary Corps
 21st Sanitary Section – joined in Egypt; joined IV Corps 9 December 1916

Divisional Transport
 11th Divisional Train, Army Service Corps (ASC) – remained in England when division went to Gallipoli; later joined 26th Division in Salonika
 112th, 113th, 114th 115th Companies, ASC
 11 Divisional Motor Ambulance Workshop  – remained in England when division went to Gallipoli and absorbed into Divisional Train
 11th Divisional Train, ASC – former 53rd (Welsh) Divisional Train left in England; joined 6 July 1916
 479th, 480th, 481st, 482nd Companies, ASC

Commanders
The following officers served as General Officer Commanding:
 Major General Frederick Hammersley (August 1914 – August 1915)
 Major General Sir Edward Fanshawe (August 1915 – July 1916)
 Lieutenant General Sir Charles Woollcombe (July–December 1916)
 Brigadier-General J. Erskine (acting) (December 1916)
 Major General Archibald Ritchie (wounded in action) (December 1916 – May 1917)
 Major General Henry Davies (wounded in action) (May 1917 – September 1918)
 Brigadier General Sir Ormonde Winter (acting) (September 1918)
 Major-General H. Davies (September–October 1918)

Battles
The division took part in the following actions:

Gallipoli Campaign1915
Battle of Suvla (in IX Corps)
 Landing at Suvla Bay, 6–15 August
 Capture of Karakol Dagh (34th Bde), 7 August
 Battle of Scimitar Hill, 21 August
 Attack on 'W' Hills, 21 August
 Evacuation of Suvla, night 19/20 December

Western Front1916
 Battle of the Somme (in II Corps, Reserve Army)
 Capture of the Wonder Work (32nd Bde) 14 September
 Battle of Flers–Courcelette, 15–22 September
 Battle of Thiepval Ridge, 26–28 September

1917
 Operations on the Aisne, 11–19 January (in IV Corps, Fifth Army)
 Battle of Messines, 9–14 June (in IX Corps, Second Army)
 Third Battle of Ypres (in XVIII Corps, Fifth Army)
 Battle of Langemarck, 16–18 August
 Fighting around St Julien, 19, 22 & 27 August
 Battle of Polygon Wood, 26 September–3 October
 Battle of Broodseinde, 4 October
 Battle of Poelcappelle, 9 October

1918
 Second Battle of Arras (in XXII Corps, First Army)
 Battle of the Scarpe, 30 August
 Battle of the Drocourt-Quéant Line, 2–3 September
 Battles of the Hindenburg Line (in Canadian Corps, First Army)
 Battle of the Canal du Nord, 27 September–1 October
 Battle of Cambrai, 8–9 September
 Pursuit to the Selle, 9–12 October
 The Final Advance in Picardy (in XXII Corps, First Army)
 Battle of the Sambre, 4 November
 Passage of the Grande Honnelle, 5–7 November

See also

 List of British divisions in World War I

Footnotes

References
 
 Maj A.F. Becke,History of the Great War: Order of Battle of Divisions, Part 3a: New Army Divisions (9–26), London: HM Stationery Office, 1938/Uckfield: Naval & Military Press, 2007, .
 Rupert Drake, The Road to Lindi: Hull Boys in Africa: The 1st (Hull) Heavy Battery Royal Garrison Artillery in East Africa and France 1914–1919, Brighton: Reveille Press, 2013, .
 Gen Sir Martin Farndale, History of the Royal Regiment of Artillery: Western Front 1914–18, Woolwich: Royal Artillery Institution, 1986, .
 
 Lt-Col Michael Young, Army Service Corps 1902–1918, Barnsley: Leo Cooper, 2000, .

External links 
 The Long, Long Trail
 The Regimental Warpath 1914–1918 (archive site)

Infantry divisions of the British Army in World War I
Kitchener's Army divisions
Military units and formations established in 1914
Military units and formations disestablished in 1919
1914 establishments in the United Kingdom